Stan Woch (born July 8, 1959) is an American comics artist who has worked on comic strips and comic books.

Career
After attending the Pratt Institute and The Kubert School, Stan Woch's early career included work as an assistant to Gray Morrow on the Barbara Cartland Romances and Buck Rogers comic strips. He then worked in the comic book industry as a penciller and inker. His first work for DC Comics was published in New Talent Showcase #1 (Jan. 1984).

His credits as a penciller include the 1980s Airboy series for Eclipse Comics as well as DC Comics' Swamp Thing and World's Finest Comics. He was one of the contributors to the DC Challenge limited series and he drew part of the "Fables & Reflections" collection of Neil Gaiman's The Sandman series. His credits as an inker include the Airboy series, Batman: Shadow of the Bat, Black Orchid, Doom Patrol, and the Robin continuing series. Woch's last new work in the comics industry was published in 1999.

Awards and nominations
His work received a nomination for the 1986 Jack Kirby Award for Best Single Issue for Swamp Thing #43 with Alan Moore.

Bibliography

DC Comics

 Batman and Robin Adventures #24 (1997) 
 The Batman Chronicles #4, 13 (1996–1998)
 The Batman Chronicles Gallery #1 (one page) (1997)
 Batman: Gotham Adventures #14 (1999) 
 Batman: No Man's Land Secret Files #1 (1999)
 Batman: Poison Ivy #1 (1997) 
 Batman: Shadow of the Bat #53–54, 56–64, 66–68, Annual #3–5 (1995–1997) 
 Black Orchid vol. 2 #1–5, 7–16, 18–22  (1993–1995) 
 Catwoman vol. 2 #48 (1997) 
 DC Challenge #12 (1986) 
 Detective Comics #565, 567, 716 (1986–1997) 
 Doom Patrol vol. 2 #51, 54–57, 59–62, 64–66 (1992–1993)
 Elvira's House of Mystery #3 (1986) 
 Hellblazer #46–48 (1991) 
 Lobo #34 (1996) 
 New Talent Showcase #1–4, 8, 13–14 (1984–1985) 
 The New Teen Titans vol. 2 #12 (1985) 
 Robin vol. 4 #18–31, 50–67, 1,000,000 (1995–1999) 
 The Saga of the Swamp Thing #38 (1985) 
 The Sandman #29–30, 36 (1991–1992) 
 Showcase '94 #10 (1994) 
 Showcase '95 #3 (Eradicator) (1995) 
 Showcase '96 #3 (Birds of Prey) (1996) 
 Steel #7 (1994) 
 Superboy vol. 3 #10, 14, 16, 35, Annual #1 (1994–1997) 
 Supergirl Annual #1 (1996) 
 Superman Adventures #20 (1998) 
 Superman Annual #6–7 (1994–1995) 
 Swamp Thing vol. 2 #43, 45, 47, 49, Annual #3 (1985–1987) 
 Talent Showcase #16–17 (1985)
 Teen Titans Spotlight #14 (Nightwing) (1987)
 Who's Who in the DC Universe #15 (1992)
 Who's Who in the DC Universe Update 1993 #2 (1993)
 Who's Who: The Definitive Directory of the DC Universe #18, 21 (1986)
 Wonder Woman #318–320 (Huntress) (1984) 
 World's Finest Comics #310–315 (1984–1985)

Eclipse Comics

 Airboy #3–10, 12–16, 33–37, 40–43, 45 (1986–1988)
 James Bond 007: Licence to Kill (1989)
 Miracleman: Apocrypha #1 (1991)
 ORBiT #1–3 (1990)
 Real War Stories #1 (1987)
 Tapping the Vein #4 (1990)
 Total Eclipse #5 (backup story) (1989)

Marvel Comics
 Darkhold: Pages from the Book of Sins #6 (1993)
 Official Handbook of the Marvel Universe Deluxe Edition #8, 10 (1986)
 Savage Sword of Conan #99 (1984)

References

External links
 
 Stan Woch at Mike's Amazing World of Comics
 Stan Woch at the Unofficial Handbook of Marvel Comics Creators

1959 births
20th-century American artists
21st-century American artists
American comics artists
DC Comics people
Living people
Pratt Institute alumni
The Kubert School alumni